Naa Manasistha Raa is a 2001 Indian Telugu-language romantic thriller film directed by R. R. Shinde. It stars Srikanth, Soundarya, and Richa Pallod. The film is a remake of the Tamil film Parthen Rasithen (2000).

The film released on 18 July 2001 and was a box office failure.

Plot
Shankar, an aeronautical engineer, is a soft spoken man. He befriends Nandini, a student of medicine and the both share a platonic relationship. Despite this, Shankar spends a lot of time as a loaner blowing his mouth organ. Seershika, who works as an employee at a private firm, meets Shankar and starts liking him as a person as well as his taste in music.

Shankar reciprocates her feelings, and they both fall in love with each other. As they decide to get marry, Shankar's parents who live in Dubai come to India as start the wedding arrangements. Meanwhile, Nandini takes an opportunity and confesses his love to Shankar. Disheartened Seershika consumes poison in an attempt to suicide and gets hospitalized. Shankar, however, never had any romantic feelings towards Nandini. Nonetheless, Nandini remains adamant to marry to Shankar. Seershika is now determined to get back her love, successfully faces all the hurdles and wins back Shankar's love.

Cast
Srikanth as Shankar
Soundarya as Nandini
Richa Pallod as Seershika
Kota Srinivasa Rao as Shankar's father 
Sangeeta as Shankar's mother 
Prithivi 
Brahmanandam
Sivaji Raja
Sudhakar
Tanikella Bharani
Hema

Production 
After the success of films ending with 'Raa', Ninne Premistha (2000) director R. R. Shinde titled this film Naa Manasistha Raa. The film is produced by Sudhakar, who produced Taraka Ramudu (1997). Shooting was scheduled to start on 18 January 2001 but was postponed to the second week of February of the same year. Srikanth and Soundarya shot for this film and Kalisi Naduddam (2001) at the same time.

Soundtrack 
Songs are composed by S. A. Rajkumar. The song "Twinkle Twinkle" is based on "Parthen Rasithen" from the original.
"Twinkle Twinkle" -  Rajesh, Sunitha
"Punnami Jabili" - S. P. Balasubrahmanyam, Sunitha
"Kadantava" - Rajesh, Sunitha
"Sakkubai" - Udit Narayan
"Champodhe"  - Shankar Mahadevan, Anuradha Sriram
"Ooh Prema" - Devan

Reception
Griddaluru Gopalrao of Zamin Ryot gave a positive review for the film. He appreciated the storyline, performances of the leads and camerawork of the film. Ajay Bashyam of Full Hyderabad opined that "Right from the name (ouch!), everything about Naa Manasista... Raa! is filmy. It's an old problem - the story starts off pretty okay and has enough steam to carry it till the interval, then there is the twist [...] and then the writer keeps coming up with new problems just to pull along the film for the second half".

Box office 
A writer from News18 attributed the film's failure with the audience's rejection of Soundarya in a negative role.

References

External links

Telugu remakes of Tamil films